Southern may refer to:

Businesses
 China Southern Airlines, airline based in Guangzhou, China
 Southern Airways, defunct US airline
 Southern Air, air cargo transportation company based in Norwalk, Connecticut, US
 Southern Airways Express, Memphis-based passenger air transportation company, serving eight cities in the US
 Southern Company, US electricity corporation
 Southern Music (now Peermusic), US record label
 Southern Railway (disambiguation), various railways
 Southern Records, independent British record label
 Southern Studios, recording studio in London, England
 Southern Television, defunct UK television company
 Southern (Govia Thameslink Railway), brand used for some train services in Southern England

Media
 88.3 Southern FM, a non-commercial community radio station based in Melbourne, Australia
 Heart Sussex, a radio station in Sussex, England, previously known as "Southern FM"
 Nanfang Daily or Southern Daily, the official Communist Party newspaper based in Guangdong, China
 Southern Weekly, a newspaper in Guangzhou, China
 The Southern Illinoisan, known as The Southern, newspaper in Carbondale, Illinois, US

Music
 Southern (band), an indie rock duo from Belfast, Northern Ireland
 "Southern", a song by Orchestral Manoeuvres in the Dark on the album The Pacific Age

People 
 Southern (surname)

Schools
 Southern University (formal name Southern University and A&M College), Baton Rouge, Louisiana
 Southern University at New Orleans, Louisiana
 Southern University at Shreveport, Louisiana
 Southern University College, a non-profit, private university college in Malaysia
 Southern High School (disambiguation), various schools

Sports
 Southern 500, a NASCAR car race
 Southern 500 (1950-2004), a former NASCAR race
 Southern Conference, an American Division I college athletic conference
 Southern League (disambiguation), various sports leagues

See also 
 Culture of the Southern United States, also known as Southern culture, Southern heritage, or simply Southern, a regional subculture with a unique history and identity 
 Sothern, persons with the surname
 
 South (disambiguation)
 Southern Comfort (disambiguation)
 Southern Party, a minor American political party that disbanded in 2003
 Southern Regional (disambiguation), various organizations
 Southerner (disambiguation)